Pumpkin Hollow is a census-designated place (CDP) in Cherokee County, Oklahoma, United States, within the Cherokee Nation. It was first listed as a CDP prior to the 2020 census.

The CDP is in eastern Cherokee County, bordered to the east by Adair County, to the northwest by Tully Hollow, and to the southwest by the Illinois River, across which is the CDP of Sparrowhawk. Pumpkin Hollow is the main valley in the community, running from the northeast to the southwest end. 

Demographics

References 

Census-designated places in Cherokee County, Oklahoma
Census-designated places in Oklahoma